Trinajstić, Trinajstic is a Croatian surname. Notable people with the surname include: 

Kate Trinajstic, Australian paleontologist and evolutionary biologist
Nenad Trinajstić (1936–2021), Croatian chemist

Croatian surnames